The 2005 NCAA Bowling Championship was the second annual tournament to determine the national champion of women's NCAA collegiate ten-pin bowling. The tournament was played at Wekiva Lanes in Orlando, Florida during April 2005. 

Nebraska defeated Central Missouri State in the championship match, 4 games to 2, to win their second consecutive national title. This was a rematch of the previous year's final, also won by Nebraska. The Cornhuskers were coached by Bill Straub.

The tournament's Most outstanding bowler was Amanda Burgoyne from Nebraska. An All-tournament team of five bowlers was also named.

Qualification
Since there is only one national collegiate championship for women's bowling, all NCAA bowling programs (whether from Division I, Division II, or Division III) were eligible. A total of 8 teams were invited to contest this championship, which consisted of a double-elimination style tournament.

Tournament bracket 
Site: Wekiva Lanes, Orlando, Florida

Notes
Each match consisted of a best-of-seven series of games.
Since Nebraska won its first championship match, an additional Round 7 was not necessary.

All-tournament team
Amanda Burgoyne, Nebraska (Most outstanding bowler)
Lindsay Baker, Nebraska
Tina Peak, Central Missouri State
Elysia Current, Fairleigh Dickinson
Sarah Circle, Bethune–Cookman

References

NCAA Bowling Championship
NCAA Bowling Championship
2005 in bowling
2005 in sports in Florida
April 2005 sports events in the United States